Conant Hall is one of several graduate student residence halls at Harvard University. It is affiliated with the Harvard Graduate School of Arts and Sciences (GSAS), which is responsible for the majority of Harvard's post-baccalaureate degree programs in the humanities, natural sciences, and social sciences.

An exemplar of the Georgian Revival architecture, Conant is recognizable by its thirteen high-rise chimneys, although the built-in fireplaces are no longer functional.

History and style
Constructed in 1894, Conant Hall was designed by Shepley, Rutan and Coolidge and reflects the Georgian architecture of freshman residences found around Harvard Yard. It was built with funds gifted by Edwin Conant. Originally consisting of 29 suites, Conant has since undergone numerous renovations and currently houses 84 single rooms.

Conant Hall originally housed Harvard undergraduates, but in 1905 it was given over to graduate students.

References

Harvard University buildings
School buildings completed in 1894
1894 establishments in Massachusetts